Christopher Milne (born 24 May 1950) is an Australian actor and award-winning writer who has scripted numerous episodes of Prisoner and Neighbours, as well as appearing on the shows as a performer. He also originated the character of Philip Martin on the Australian soap opera Neighbours, in 1985 (when the program debut originally on Network Seven) before Ian Rawlings was cast in the role. He was also Ben Mazzini in  Water Under The Bridge.

Milne also acted in such films as the vampire film Thirst and Felicity.

He has written children's books (ages 6–13) for many years and his Naughty Stories for Good Boys and Girls is a winner of The Young Australians Best Book Award. He recorded 13 of the stories for the BBC in London.

References

External links

Australian male film actors
Australian children's writers
Australian male television actors
Living people
1950 births